Stirling Rowing Club is a rowing club on the River Forth, based at the intersection between Dean Crescent and Queenshaugh Drive, Riverside, Stirling, Scotland. The club is affiliated to Scottish Rowing.

History
The club was founded in 1891 although an earlier Stirling Rowing Club existed from  1853-1860.

The club has produced multiple British champions.

Honours

British champions

References

Rowing clubs in Scotland